Jenny Zeng or Yu Zeng is a Chinese venture capitalist and a serial entrepreneur. She is the founder and a managing partner at venture capital firm MSA Capital. In 2021 MSA was named named China "Firm of the Year" by PEI Magazine. In 2011 she was named one of China's 30 most influential businesswomen by the China Entrepreneur Magazine.

Biography 
Zeng was born into a military family in Chongqing, China. She was the third daughter of her parents. She studied international trade at Beijing Electronic Industrial Management Institute and graduated in 1996.

In 2002 she became the first Executive Director of China Venture Capital Association (CVCA). She started her first company Maple Valley Investments (枫谷投资) in 2004. Maple Valley gained fame by helping InTime Department Store raise US$90 million of private investment and later go public and attracted many other high-profile clients.

In 2014 she founded MSA Capital which focuses on investing in AI, genomics, mobility, consumer internet and SaaS. Her investments have included Yidu, Boss Zhiping, Cider, Mobike and Uber.

Zeng is a board member of Apple Foundation, the largest non-public charitable foundation in Tibet, and has built libraries, reading rooms and environmental projects in the region. She is also a member of The Nature Conservancy and a board member of Future Forum.

Achievements 
In 2021, Zeng was awarded as one of The Best Private Equity Investor in China by CVAwards.

In 2022, Zeng was ranked 57th on the Forbes China Venture Capital 100.

In 2022, Zeng was selected as the 30 Most Influential Investors in China by Fortune China.

In 2022, MSA Capital led by Zeng was ranked Top 28 on 2022 Top 50 Best VC Funds by China FOF Research Center.

In 2022 and 2023, Zeng was selected as one of Forbes China Female Venture Capitalist Top 20 in two consecutive years.

Personal life 
Zeng gave birth to a child in the spring of 2010.

References

External links
MSA Capital company website

Chinese venture capitalists
Living people
Year of birth missing (living people)
Businesspeople from Chongqing
21st-century Chinese businesswomen
21st-century Chinese businesspeople